Denis Grimes (1864–1920) was a famous Irish sportsperson.  He played hurling with his local club Kilfinane and with the Limerick senior inter-county team in the 1890s.  Grimes captained Limerick to their first All-Ireland title in 1897.

Biography

Denis Grimes was born in Kilfinane, County Limerick on 7 August 1864.  The son of John and Mary (née Casey), he received a limited education at the local national school. In a time when opportunities were few, Grimes later worked as a labourer and, like many of his fellow countrymen, he was forced to emigrate.  Grimes moved to Wales around the turn of the 20th century and worked in the coalmines.  He never returned to Ireland.

Denis Grimes died in 1920.

Playing career

Club

Grimes played his club hurling with his local Kilfinane team and enjoyed some success.  He won his first senior county title in 1897 following a thrilling 4-9 to 4-8 victory over Cappamore.  It is possible that Grimes captured a second county title two years later in 1899.

Inter-county

Kilfinane’s county championship victory allowed the club to represent Limerick in the Munster and All-Ireland championships.  Grimes, as well as the goalkeeper on the team, was also appointed captain for the year.

Limerick breezed through the provincial championship and reached the Munster final with Cork providing the opposition.  The game itself produced a resounding 4-9 to 1-6 victory gor Limerick.  It was Grimes’s first Munster title.  This victory allowed Limerick to advance directly to the All-Ireland final.  Kilkenny provided the opposition on that occasion as both sides were hoping to win the All-Ireland title for the first time.  ‘The Cats’ got off to a great start and led by 2-4 to 1-1 at half-time.  Limerick, however, powered on in the second-half and used their new technique of hooking.  They got two quick goals early in the half and scored the winning goal from a free after 52 minutes.  At the final whistle Limerick emerged victorious by 3-4 to 2-4.  It was Grimes’s first All-Ireland title.  He later captained Limerick to victory over Kilkenny in the Croke Cup that same year.

Teams

References

 Brendan Fullam, Captains of the Ash, (Wolfhound Press, 2004).

1864 births
1920 deaths
Kilfinane hurlers
Limerick inter-county hurlers
Hurling goalkeepers
All-Ireland Senior Hurling Championship winners